Pierre Lacaze (14 June 1925 - 4 February 2014) was a French athlete. He competed in the men's high jump at the 1948 Summer Olympics.

References

External links
 

1925 births
2014 deaths
Athletes (track and field) at the 1948 Summer Olympics
French male high jumpers
Olympic athletes of France
20th-century French people